Gesche Joost (born 1974) is a German design researcher.

Early life and education
Gesche Joost studied design at the Cologne University of Applied Sciences and completed her PhD in Rhetoric at the University of Tübingen.

Career

Since 2011, Joost has been a professor at the Berlin University of the Arts specializing in design research, and since 2005, she has been the head of the Design Research Lab at Telekom Innovation Laboratories (also known as T-Labs). Joost focuses her research on human-computer interaction, aspects of gender and diversity in communications technology, social sustainability in design, as well as design theory and research.

In 2002, Joost was a founding board member of DGTF (the German Society for Design Theory and Research), which she has also chaired since 2008.

During the winter semester 2007/2008 Joost was a visiting professor at the University of Applied Sciences in Hildesheim (HAWK) for Gender & Design. From 2008 to 2010, she held an assistant professorship at TU Berlin for Interaction Design & Media. She directs several research projects at T-Labs, for example on tactile human-computer interaction. Within the scope of the Generation 50+ project, she participated in the development of the DECT telephone Sinus A 201 (funded by Deutsche Telekom) and received the iF product design award in 2010.

From 2006, Joost served as personal adviser to Germany's former finance minister Peer Steinbrück. In the negotiations to form a Grand Coalition of Chancellor Angela Merkel's Christian Democrats (CDU together with the Bavarian CSU) and the SPD following the 2013 German elections, she was part of the SPD delegation in the working group on digital policy, led by Dorothee Bär and Brigitte Zypries.

Criticism
In 2013, questioned Joost's independence in research and teaching on the basis of its close ties with Deutsche Telekom, citing, among others, objections by Pirate Party politician Ralf Engelhardt and lawyer Jörg Heidrich.

In 2018, Der Spiegel and the ARD magazine "Report Mainz" reported on Joost's voluntary work on the Calliope project, which was compensated by the Federal Ministry of Education and Research for 50,000 euros per year.

Other activities

Corporate boards
 SAP SE, Member of the supervisory board (since 2015)
 Volkswagen, Member of the Sustainability Council (since 2016)
 CeBIT, Member of the CeBIT Innovation Award Jury

Non-profit organizations
 Deutsche Telekom Stiftung, Member of the Board of Trustees
 Deutschland sicher im Netz (DSIN), Member of the Advisory Board
 German Society for Design Theory and Research (DGTF), Chairwoman
 Evangelical Church in Germany (EKD), Member of the Synod
 Goethe-Institut, Member of the General Meeting
 German National Academic Foundation, Member of the Executive Board
 Technologiestiftung Berlin, Member of the Board
 Center for Art and Media Karlsruhe (ZKM), Member of the Board of Trustees
 Federal Ministry of Justice and Consumer Protection (BMJV), Member of the Expert Advisory Board on Consumer Protection Issues (since 2014)
 D64, Member of the Advisory Board

Honors and wards
 2006: 100 masterminds of tomorrow
 2006: The 100 most important young Germans
 2008: Science Award of the Governing Mayor of Berlin for Young Researchers

Publications
Joost's many publications include Bild-Sprache. Die audio-visuelle Rhetorik des Films (2008) as well as Design als Rhetorik (2008).

References

External links 

 
 

1974 births
German designers
Scientists from Kiel
Academic staff of the Berlin University of the Arts
Living people